Alstonia rubiginosa is a species of plant in the family Apocynaceae. It is endemic to Papua New Guinea.

References

rubiginosa
Endemic flora of Papua New Guinea
Trees of Papua New Guinea
Taxonomy articles created by Polbot